Laura Keates (born 5 August 1988) is an English female rugby union player.

Career
Keates captained the England Women's under 19 team in 2007.
She injured her Achilles while preparing for the 2017 World Cup, and didn't play again for England until the 25 - 23 win over France on 21 November 2020. She was named in the England squad for the delayed 2021 Rugby World Cup held in New Zealand in October and November 2022  but was forced to withdraw from the squad after suffering an anterior cruciate ligament injury in training.

Personal life
Keates studied zoology at Birmingham University (BSc Zoology 2010) and is studying dentistry at the same university

References

External links
England Player Profile

1998 births
Living people
Alumni of the University of Birmingham
England women's international rugby union players
English female rugby union players